Glenworth Valley is a suburb of the  local government area in the Central Coast region of New South Wales, Australia. Popran Creek runs through the entire valley and rises in the locality of Central Mangrove and then flows for approximately 24 km (15 mi) in a mostly southern direction until it reaches Mangrove Creek.

History

(For a more comprehensive coverage of the History of the Popran and Glenworth Valley proceed to adjacent Wikipedia page also titled Glenworth Valley  Glenworth Valley

The history of Popran Creek and Glenworth Valley includes pre and post-European settlement. Indigenous people from the 'Daruk' and 'Darkinyung' communities populated the lower Hawkesbury region- migrating between valleys hunting and fishing.

After initial exploration by Europeans primary industrial activities included timber getting, small farming, dairying and fishing. Some of these settlers remained in the Mangrove and Glenworth Valley locality for at least five generations.

See also 

List of valleys of Australia
Hawkesbury River
Mangrove Creek (New South Wales)
Joseph Kelly (New South Wales politician)
Glenworth Valley site focussing on history of the Popran valley

References 

Suburbs of the Central Coast (New South Wales)